The weightlifting competitions at the 2024 Summer Olympics in Paris are scheduled to run from 7 to 11 August at the Paris Expo Porte de Versailles. Several significant changes are instituted in the weightlifting program for Paris 2024, as the number of categories is trimmed from fourteen in Tokyo to ten. Furthermore, a total of 120 weightlifters, with an equal split between men and women, will compete in each of the ten weight classes, a massive drop from a full roster size of 196 at the previous Games.

Qualification

120 weightlifting quota places, with an equal distribution between men and women, are available for Paris 2024, almost eighty fewer overall than those in Tokyo 2020. Qualified NOCs are permitted to enter a maximum of three weightlifters per gender, with a maximum of one in each bodyweight category.

Over eighty-three percent of the total quota will be awarded to the ten highest-ranked weightlifters across ten different weight classes through the biennial IWF Olympic Qualification Ranking list (running from August 1, 2022, to April 28, 2024). Five more spots per gender will be offered to the highest-ranked weightlifter vying for qualification and outside the top ten based on their continental representation (Africa, the Americas, Asia, Europe, or Oceania) from the list.

Host country France reserves two men's and two women's quota places in weightlifting, while a further three places per gender are entitled to eligible NOCs to have their weightlifters compete in Paris 2024 as granted by the Universality principle.

Competition format
On June 14, 2022, the International Weightlifting Federation officially announced the new weight categories for Paris 2024, with the total medal count reducing from fourteen to ten. Among the weightlifting medal events, the 61 and 73 kg categories for men and the 49 and 59 kg for women remain present from Tokyo 2020. The following list is the official weight categories for men and women, respectively.

Men's weight classes
 61 kg
 73 kg
 89 kg
 102 kg
 +102 kg

Women's weight classes
 49 kg
 59 kg
 71 kg
 81 kg
 +81 kg

Competition schedule

Medalists

Medal table

Men's events

Women's events

See also
Weightlifting at the 2022 Asian Games
Weightlifting at the 2022 Commonwealth Games
Weightlifting at the 2023 Pan American Games

References 

 
2024
2024 Summer Olympics events
Olympic Games
International weightlifting competitions hosted by France